Sushil Singh (born 25 December 1976) is an Indian politician and a member of the 17th Legislative Assembly of Uttar Pradesh of India. He represents the Saiyad Raja Assembly constituency in Chandauli district of Uttar Pradesh and is a member of the Bhartiya Janta Party.

Early life and education
Sushil Singh was born in Varanasi in 1976. Prior to entering politics, he was and still in government contracting business. Contrary to the popular belief he never worked in a bank.

Political career
Sushil Singh has been MLA for four terms. He is a member of the Bhartiya Janta Party . During his previous terms, he represented Dhanapur and Sakaldiha assembly constituency respectively,

Three people who were alleging to kill Singh were arrested on 9 August 2019.

Posts held

External links
Bhartiya Janta Party
Government of India
Politics of India
Uttar Pradesh Legislative Assembly
Sakaldiha

References 

1976 births
Living people
People from Chandauli district
Uttar Pradesh MLAs 2017–2022
Uttar Pradesh MLAs 2012–2017
Uttar Pradesh MLAs 2007–2012
Uttar Pradesh MLAs 2022–2027
Bharatiya Janata Party politicians from Uttar Pradesh